Roy Davidson (March 3, 1896 – August 19, 1962) was an American special effects artist. He was nominated an Oscar for Best Special Effects for the film Only Angels Have Wings at the 12th Academy Awards.

References

External links

1896 births
1962 deaths
Special effects people
Place of birth missing